Mark Quinlan (born 2000, Galbally, Co. Limerick) is an Irish hurler who plays for Limerick Senior Championship club Garryspillane and at inter-county level with the Limerick senior hurling team. He usually lines out as a right wing-back.

Career statistics

Honours

Garryspillane
Limerick Premier Intermediate Hurling Championship (1): 2019

Limerick
All-Ireland Senior Hurling Championship (1): 2020
Munster Senior Hurling Championship (1): 2020
National Hurling League (1): 2020
Munster Senior Hurling League (2): 2020

References

2000 births
Living people
Garryspillane hurlers
Limerick inter-county hurlers